Indoetra is a monotypic genus of south Asian orb-weaver spiders containing the single species, Indoetra thisbe. Originally described as a subgenus of Clitaetra, it was elevated to genus status in 2019. It has only been found in Sri Lanka.

See also
 List of Araneidae species: G–M

References

Further reading

Monotypic Araneidae genera
Arthropods of Sri Lanka